In signal processing, a quadrature filter  is the analytic representation of the impulse response  of a real-valued filter:

If the quadrature filter  is applied to a signal , the result is

Since  is an analytic signal, it is either zero or complex-valued.  In practice, therefore,  is often implemented as two real-valued filters, which correspond to the real and imaginary parts of the filter, respectively.

An ideal quadrature filter cannot have a finite support. It has single sided support, but by choosing the (analog) function  carefully, it is possible to design quadrature filters which are localized such that they can be approximated by means of functions of finite support. A digital realization without feedback (FIR) has finite support.

Applications
This construction will simply assemble an analytic signal with a starting point to finally create a causal signal with finite energy. The two Delta Distributions will perform this operation. This will impose an additional constraint on the filter.

Single frequency signals
For single frequency signals (in practice narrow bandwidth signals) with frequency  the magnitude of the response of a quadrature filter equals the signal's amplitude A times the frequency function of the filter at frequency .

This property can be useful when the signal s is a narrow-bandwidth signal of unknown frequency.  By choosing a suitable frequency function Q of the filter, we may generate known functions of the unknown frequency  which then can be estimated.

See also
 Analytic signal
 Hilbert transform

Signal processing